Masticophis schotti, commonly known as Schott's whip snake, is a species of snake in the family Colubridae.

Geographic range
The species is found in United States in Texas and in western Mexico. It lives up to an altitude of 2300 meters.

Subspecies
Masticophis schotti ruthveni  – Ruthven's whip snake
Masticophis schotti schotti  – Schott's whip snake

Etymology
Its species name was given to it in honor of Arthur Schott. The subspecies Masticophis schotti ruthveni is named in honor of Alexander Grant Ruthven.

References

Original publications 
 Baird & Girard, 1853 : Catalogue of North American Reptiles in the Museum of the Smithsonian Institution. Part 1.-Serpents. Smithsonian Institution, Washington,  (Full text).
 Ortenburger, 1923 : A note on the genera Coluber and Masticophis and a description of a new species of Masticophis. Occasional papers of the Museum of Zoology, University of Michigan,  (Full text).
 Smith, 1941 : Notes on Mexican snakes of the genus Masticophis. Journal of the Washington Academy of Sciences,  (Full text).

Colubrids
Snakes of Central America
Snakes of North America
Reptiles of the United States
Reptiles of Mexico
Reptiles described in 1853
Taxa named by Charles Frédéric Girard
Taxa named by Spencer Fullerton Baird